Juan Pedro Ramírez López (born 30 April 1991), known as Juanpe , is a Spanish professional footballer who plays as a centre-back for La Liga club Girona.

Club career
Born in Las Palmas, Canary Islands, Juanpe graduated from UD Las Palmas' youth academy. He made his debut as a senior with the reserves in 2008, in Tercera División.

On 13 June 2009, Juanpe played his first match as a professional, coming on as a late substitute in a 0–0 home draw against Rayo Vallecano in the Segunda División. After a full season with the B side, he was definitely promoted to the first team on 22 June 2010.

Juanpe scored his first goal in the second division on 21 January 2012, a last-minute header in the 1–1 draw at CE Sabadell FC. On 2 September of the following year he cut ties with the club, and moved to Racing de Santander of Segunda División B two days later.

After achieving promotion to the second tier, Juanpe signed a three-year contract with Granada CF on 12 June 2014, being initially assigned to the reserves in division three. On 28 August he returned to Racing, penning a one-year loan deal.

On 21 July 2015, Juanpe agreed to a one-year contract extension with the Andalusians, being also loaned to Real Valladolid in a season-long move. On 7 July of the following year, he signed a three-year permanent deal with Girona FC also in the second tier.

Juanpe contributed 34 appearances during the season, helping the club promote to La Liga for the first time ever. He made his debut in the competition on 26 August 2017, replacing Borja García late into a 1–0 home win over Málaga CF.

Notes

References

External links

1991 births
Living people
Spanish footballers
Footballers from Las Palmas
Association football defenders
La Liga players
Segunda División players
Segunda División B players
Tercera División players
UD Las Palmas Atlético players
UD Las Palmas players
Racing de Santander players
Granada CF footballers
Real Valladolid players
Girona FC players